Oestrophasia signifera is a species of bristle fly in the family Tachinidae.

Distribution
Canada, United States Mexico, Trinidad and Tobago, Costa Rica.

References

Dexiinae
Taxa named by Frederik Maurits van der Wulp
Insects described in 1890
Diptera of North America